Michel Pou (born 3 October 1965) is a French freestyle swimmer. He competed at the 1984 Summer Olympics and the 1988 Summer Olympics.

References

External links
 

1965 births
Living people
French male freestyle swimmers
Olympic swimmers of France
Swimmers at the 1984 Summer Olympics
Swimmers at the 1988 Summer Olympics
Sportspeople from Nice
20th-century French people
21st-century French people